Derrick Ned (born January 5, 1969) is a former American football fullback. He played for the New Orleans Saints from 1993 to 1995.

References

1969 births
Living people
American football fullbacks
Grambling State Tigers football players
New Orleans Saints players